The 2019–20 Israeli Noar Premier League is the twenty-eight season since its introduction in 1999 and the 80th season of top-tier football in Israel. The season began in August 2019. On 13 April 2020 the league was suspended indefinitely due to the coronavirus pandemic. Maccabi Haifa were awarded the championship following the cancellation of the 2019–20 season. It was also decided there will be no relegations.

League table

References

External links
 Noar Premier League IFA 

Israeli Noar Premier League seasons
Youth